A list of Pakistani Bengali films in year order:

All Bengali films released during the period of undivided Pakistan (before independence of Bangladesh from Pakistan following the 1971 Liberation War) are included under "Bengali" films. But Urdu films made in (Dhaka, Bangladesh) are included in "Urdu" films tally.

A total number of 156 Bengali feature films were produced in East Pakistan from 1956-71.

List

See also
 Cinema of Bangladesh
 List of Bangladeshi films
 List of Indian Bengali films
 Cinema of Pakistan
 List of Pakistani films

References
 



 List
Lists of Pakistani films
Films